The Condor Heroes Return is a Hong Kong television series loosely based on the stories of two characters in Louis Cha's novel The Legend of the Condor Heroes. The series was released overseas in October 1993 before broadcasting on TVB Jade in Hong Kong in March 1994.

Cast
 Note: Some of the characters' names are in Cantonese romanisation.

 Ekin Cheng as Duen Chi-hing
 Marco Ngai as Hung Tsat-kung
 Wong Siu-yin as Ching Suet-sam
 Charine Chan as Lau Ying
 Chan Wai-yee as Miu See-yan
 Wayne Lai as Chow Pak-tung
 Cheung Ying-choi as Wong Chung-yeung
 Lam Seung-mou as Chin Hok-sing
 Lee Ka-keung as Lo Yau-keuk
 Kong Hon as Ching Tit-san
 Mak Ka-lun as Keeper Tsai
 Wong Seung-sing as Beggars' Gang elder
 Yu Tin-wai as Beggars' Gang elder
 Yip Tsan-wai as Beggars' Gang elder
 Shek Ngai-wan as beggar
 Gordon Lam as beggar
 Cho Tsai as beggar
 Yau Biu as beggar
 Cheung Wang-wai as beggar
 Cheung Hoi-kan as beggar
 Wong Wai as Duen Man-chung
 Lau Ying-hong as Chin Yuk-lan
 Man Kit-wan as Ling-tsau Palace mistress
 Wong Wai-tak as Fisherman
 Wong Man-piu as Woodcutter
 Cheng Ka-sang as Farmer
 Kwok Cheuk-wah as Scholar
 Kwok Cheng-hung as Yuen-ngan Hung-kit
 Henry Lee as Duen Man-Yee
 Kwan Ching as Kau Chin-yan
 Lo Mang as Lui-ting Sheung-yan
 Lee Kwai-ying as Water
 Fung Hiu-man as Wood
 Lee Yiu-king as Metal
 Siu Cheuk-yiu as Earth
 Wong Kin-fung as Fire
 Lee Lung-kei as Kam Nga-kwai
 Tse Yuet-may as Hung Tsat-kung's mother
 Wong Chung-hong as Chu-Yau-ko
 Wong Wai-lam as Ngau-pak-nam
 Siu Yuk-yin as Hong-lin
 Ng Lit-wah as Mat-to
 Cheung Man-duen as Nam-hang
 Chu Tit-wo as Lau Kwong
 Koi Ngok as Master Do-hung
 Mak Ho-wai as Emperor Ko-tsung
 Tsang Kin-ming
 Mak Tsi-wan
 Chan Min-leung
 Tang Yuk-wing
 Wong Wai-tung
 Sit Chun
 Chan Fung-bing
 Tang Yu-chiu
 Bok-kwan

References

External links

1994 Hong Kong television series debuts
1994 Hong Kong television series endings
TVB dramas
Hong Kong wuxia television series
Television shows based on The Legend of the Condor Heroes
Television series set in the Southern Song
Prequel television series
Cantonese-language television shows